Maibach may refer to:

Places
Maibach (Poppenhausen), a locality of Poppenhausen, in Bavaria, Germany
Maibach (Butzbach), a borough of Butzbach, in Hesse, Germany

People with the surname
Howard Maibach (born 1929), American dermatologist
Edward Maibach, an expert in public health and climate change communication

Other uses
Maibach (Axtbach), a river of North Rhine-Westphalia, Germany

See also
Maybach